Aleksandar Popović (born 29 September 1999) is a Serbian professional footballer who plays as a goalkeeper for Partizan.

Club career

Partizan
After coming through the youth system of Partizan, Popović was loaned to affiliated club Teleoptik in the summer of 2017. He was promoted back to the Partizan first team during the 2018 winter transfer window. After failing to make his official debut for the side, Popović was again loaned to Teleoptik in the summer of 2018. He was recalled back to Partizan in early 2019.

On 19 June 2020, Popović made his official debut for Partizan in a 1–0 away loss at Vojvodina in the last round of the COVID-19-shortened 2019–20 Serbian SuperLiga. He would become the first-choice goalkeeper for the 2020–21 Serbian SuperLiga, mainly due to new league requirements for under-21 players, making 21 appearances in the process.

Upon the departure of Vladimir Stojković, Popović made his debut in European competitions on 29 July 2021, keeping a clean sheet and saving a penalty in a 2–0 away victory over Slovak club DAC Dunajská Streda in the UEFA Conference League. He extended his contract with Partizan two months later, keeping him with the club until 2024.

During 2022–23 UEFA Europa Conference League Group D, Popović kept a clean sheet twice against FC Köln.

International career
Popović was capped for Serbia at under-17, under-19 and under-21 levels in UEFA competitions. He made his full international debut for Serbia in a goalless friendly with Panama on 28 January 2021.

Career statistics

Club

International

Honours
Partizan
 Serbian Cup: 2017–18, 2018–19

Notes

References

External links
 
 

Association football goalkeepers
FK Partizan players
FK Teleoptik players
Serbia international footballers
Serbia under-21 international footballers
Serbia youth international footballers
Serbian First League players
Serbian footballers
Serbian SuperLiga players
Sportspeople from Užice
1999 births
Living people